Fraillon is a surname. It may refer to:

 Nicolette Fraillon (born 1960), Australian conductor
 Zana Fraillon (born 1981), Australian writer for children and young adults